MSC Software Corporation is an American simulation software technology company based in Newport Beach, California, that specializes in simulation software.

In February 2017, the company was acquired by Swedish technology company Hexagon AB for $834 million. It operates as an independent subsidiary

History
MSC Software Corporation was formed in 1963 under the name MacNeal-Schwendler Corporation (MSC), by Dr. Richard H. MacNeal and Robert Schwendler.  The company developed its first structural analysis software called SADSAM (Structural Analysis by Digital Simulation of Analog Methods) at that time and was deeply involved in the early efforts of the aerospace industry to improve early finite element analysis technology.

A key milestone was responding to a 1965 request for proposal (RFP) from the National Aeronautics and Space Administration (NASA) for a general-purpose structural analysis program that would eventually become Nastran (NASA Structural Analysis).  The company subsequently pioneered many of the technologies that are now relied upon by industry to analyze and predict stress and strain, vibration and dynamics, acoustics, and thermal analysis.  In 1971, the company released a commercial version of Nastran, named MSC/Nastran.

Two years after MSC began marketing MSC/Nastran, the company established its first overseas office in Munich, Germany. Three years after entering Europe, MSC moved eastward and opened an office in Tokyo, Japan. In 1983, MSC made its debut as a public company, and a year later the stock migrated to the American Stock Exchange. The company expanded in 1992 by adding a subsidiary in Moscow, Russia. In 1995, it further expanded its growth by adding an office in Brazil.  In June 1999, MSC's stockholders voted to change the company's name to MSC.Software Corporation.

In July 2009, MSC Software was acquired by the private equity firm Symphony Technology Group. The "dot" was dropped from the company's name in 2011 and the company's name is currently MSC Software Corporation.

The company is headquartered in Newport Beach, California and employs approximately 1,400 people in 20 countries.  2016 revenue was US$230 million.  In February 2017, the company was acquired by Swedish engineering services conglomerate Hexagon.

Acquisitions 
September 1994 - PDA Engineering

December 1998 - Knowledge Revolution

May 1999 - MSC Software acquired MARC Analysis Research Corporation to add software that tests complex designs and materials.

June 1999 - Universal Analytics Incorporation (UAI)

November 1999 - Computerized Structural Analysis Research Corporation (CSAR)

May 2001 - Advanced Enterprise Solutions Inc. (AES).

March 2002 - MSC Software acquired Mechanical Dynamics Inc. to increase its client base to over 10,000 companies.

January 2008 - MSC Software acquired thermal analysis company Network Analysis Inc. to solidify its ability to serve the thermal management market.

September 2011 - MSC Software acquired acoustic simulation company Free Field Technologies, S.A.FFT to extend its solutions to acoustic simulation 

September 2012 - MSC Software acquired composite material simulation leader e-Xstream engineering company.

February 2015 - MSC Software acquired Simufact Engineering leader in the simulation of metal forming and joining processes.

December 2016 - MSC Software Acquired Software Cradle Co., Ltd, a leader in CFD simulation.

May 2017 - MSC acquires Vires Simulationstechnologie GmbH leader in autonomous vehicle simulation.

See also 

 MSC Adams
 Actran
 MSC Nastran

References

Notes
"Competition, Defense Industry Cuts Hurt Price of MacNeal-Schwendler Corp. Stock," Los Angeles Business Journal, June 4, 1990, p. 32.
Deady, Tim, "Revenge of the Nerd," Los Angeles Business Journal, April 29, 1996, p. 13.
"MacNeal-Schwendler Corp.," Machine Design, November 26, 1992, p. 103.
Teague, Paul E., "Pioneer in Engineering Analysis: Dick MacNeal Conceived One of the Most Widely Used Finite Element Analysis Codes in the World," Design News, July 10, 1995, p. 50.

External links
 MSC Software

Business software
3D graphics software
Computer-aided design software
Computer-aided manufacturing software
Computer-aided engineering software
Product lifecycle management
Mesh generators